Christopher Sean Lowe (born 4 October 1959) is an English musician, singer and songwriter, and co-founder of the synth-pop duo Pet Shop Boys, which he formed with Neil Tennant in 1981.

Biography
Lowe attended Arnold School, an independent school in his home town Blackpool, Lancashire. Whilst at school, he played trombone in a seven-piece dance band called One Under the Eight that played old-time favourites like "Hello Dolly", "La Bamba" and "Moon River". Lowe's grandfather had been a trombonist and was a member of comedy jazz troupe The Nitwits. Lowe also learned to play the piano.

Lowe studied architecture at the University of Liverpool from 1978 but, as he stated on television appearances and in the Life in Pop documentary, never graduated, due to the formation of Pet Shop Boys. During a work placement in 1981 at a London architectural practice, he designed a staircase for an industrial estate in Milton Keynes. It was at this time that he met Neil Tennant in a hi-fi shop on King's Road in London.

Musical career

Pet Shop Boys

Lowe generally performs as the Pet Shop Boys' keyboardist; he occasionally provides spoken-word vocals.

On the songs "I Want A Lover" and "What Have I Done to Deserve This?," Lowe played trombone, which he studied at school.

Solo appearances
In 1993 he wrote and produced the track "Do the Right Thing" for the footballer Ian Wright (Lowe is a passionate Arsenal F.C. fan). The song featured backing vocals by the long-time Pet Shop Boys' backing singer, Sylvia Mason-James, and the single featured remixes by Rollo.

Two years later, Lowe had a cameo in the Australian soap opera Neighbours. His appearance was filmed whilst Pet Shop Boys were touring that country.

In 2004, he was commissioned to do music for an advertisement for the sunscreen brand Blockhead. The song ended up in a remixed version on a "Café Mambo" chill-out compilation.

Two years later, he wrote the music for the song "Streets of Berlin", featured in the revival of Bent at the Trafalgar Studios in Whitehall.

In 2011, Lowe appeared as featured vocalist on Stop Modernists's cover version of the New Order song "Subculture". This was the first time he had appeared as vocals on a non-Pet Shop Boys' project.

Public image
Lowe adopts an understated public presence, often wearing sportswear and with his eyes hidden behind sunglasses. In Pet Shop Boys videos and photoshoots he is often seen looking on as a spectator standing slightly behind Tennant. In live performances he rarely interacts with the audience and often stands still while playing keyboards. In 1995, The Guardian commented that he was "possibly more famous for not doing anything than almost anyone else in the history of popular entertainment."
  
A Guardian profile of the group from 1993 noted that Lowe's image of "silent Chris walking two steps behind singing Neil" was an intentional choice, developed in discussion with photographer and music video director Eric Watson; Watson has commented that "Chris didn't want to be seen playing keyboards or anything. We realised there was something about somebody singing and somebody else doing nothing – just looking, then looking away – that adds a hideous tension."

Notes

References

External links
Official Pet Shop Boys Site
Chris Lowe discography at Discogs

1959 births
Living people
Alumni of the University of Liverpool
British disco musicians
English dance musicians
English electronic musicians
English keyboardists
English pop musicians
English record producers
Ivor Novello Award winners
Musicians from Blackpool
People educated at Arnold School
Pet Shop Boys members
Electronic (band) members